Agri-Fab, Inc. is an American manufacturer of lawn and garden attachments located in Sullivan, Illinois. Agri-Fab operates a  manufacturing facility and at peak season employs nearly 400 employees in a town of 4,700 and the surrounding  area.

Products 
Agri-Fab currently produces a variety of tractor attachments.

Its groomers consist of spike aerators, plug aerators, and dethatchers. Aerators are used to loosen compacted soil and allow nutrients to be better absorbed into the soil. They also help the grass roots grow deeper and the turf become thicker. As far as dethatchers go, Agri-Fab produces a variety including one that attaches to most lawn sweepers. Dethatchers are used to remove thatch, a layer of accumulating/slowly decomposing grass clippings, roots, grass stems, and debris that settle on the ground over time.

Agri-Fab's main products, lawn sweepers, use rotating brushes to collect debris such as grass clippings, leaves, pine needles, twigs, and other debris and they are placed into a collection/hopper bag.

References

External links 

 Official Agri-Fab Website

Manufacturing companies based in Illinois
Garden tool manufacturers